James Buckley may refer to:

 James Buckley (actor) (born 1987), English actor who stars in The Inbetweeners
 James Buckley (bishop) (1770–1828), English Roman Catholic bishop of Geras
 James L. Buckley (born 1923), American Senator from New York, corporate director and federal judge
 James Monroe Buckley (1836–1920), American Methodist doctor, preacher, and editor
 James R. Buckley (1870–1945), U.S. Representative from Illinois 
 James V. Buckley (1894–1954), U.S. Representative from Illinois
 Jim Buckley (born 1959), Australian rules footballer
 James Buckley, head of the blackface minstrel troupe Buckley's Serenaders
 James Buckley (priest) (1849–1924), Archdeacon of Llandaff
 Jimmy Buckley (c. 1905–1943), Royal Navy Fleet Air Arm pilot and prisoner of war

See also 
 James Buchli (1945-), U.S. Astronaut